Fairmount is a suburb of Johannesburg, South Africa. It is a small suburb tucked between Glenhazel and Sydenham. It is located in Region E of the City of Johannesburg Metropolitan Municipality.

History
Prior to the discovery of gold on the Witwatersrand in 1886, the suburb lay on land on one of the original farms called Klipfontein. It became a suburb on 23 March 1938, developed by Leslie John Elderkin and the suburb name originates after a visit by the former to the Fairmount Hotel in Livingstone.

References

Johannesburg Region E